The men's 3000 metres steeplechase event was part of the track and field athletics programme at the 1924 Summer Olympics. The competition was held on Monday, July 7, 1924, and on Wednesday, July 9, 1924. As the official film of the Games shows, race was run on the infield of the 500M track, and each barrier was formed of a different kind of fencing, including a deep water jump and a sloped picket fence.   Twenty runners from ten nations competed.

Records
These were the standing world and Olympic records (in minutes) prior to the 1924 Summer Olympics.

(*) unofficial

In the first run Elias Katz set a new Olympic record with 9:43.8 minutes. In the final Ville Ritola improved the record with 9:33.6 minutes.

Results

Semifinals

All semi-finals were held on Monday, July 7, 1924.

The best three finishers of every heat qualified for the final.

Semifinal 1

Semifinal 2

Semifinal 3

Final
The final was held on Wednesday, July 9, 1924.

References

External links
Olympic Report
 

Men's steeplechase 3000 metres
Steeplechase at the Olympics